The Un-Road Trip is an American reality television series featuring Boaz Frankel, a Portland, Oregon resident, as he travels 12,000 miles across North America using 101 non-gas powered modes of transportation. Most of the show was filmed over a ten-week period beginning in April 2009. It was first aired as a weekly series on Halogen TV, beginning on April 22, 2011.

Production
The basis for the series was a two-month trip Boaz Frankel took in spring 2009.  While involved in other projects, Frankel kept in touch "with executives or producers"  at cable networks including the Discovery Channel, hoping to turn the video footage from the trip into a series; executives at the latter "wouldn’t quite commit, but were ...eager to keep in touch."

When Frankel became aware of Halogen TV, a secular channel owned by The Inspiration Networks, he contacted them. Marshall Nord, Halogen's program director, had him flown to North Carolina to meet with staff producer Todd Lewis; as a result, Halogen licensed the video footage Frankel had made during his spring 2009 trip, and "signed him to produce, co-write and host a 10-episode series of 30-minute" episodes.  In late July 2010, Frankel returned to North Carolina where intro segments he wrote for the series were recorded; the segments were set in a  "rustic wood cabin that once served as a general store in Jim and Tammy Bakker's Heritage USA amusement park" and featured Frankel, two of his friends and an actress playing a third friend, ...pretending to listen to Frankel as he describes slides he has taken on the real trip depicted in the video footage he licensed to them. Their "(often-sarcastic) responses lead into actual video vignettes, which then form the core of the series."

List of episodes
The following is a list of episodes:

References

External links

2010s American reality television series
American travel television series
2011 American television series debuts